Reinis Nitišs (born 16 December 1995) is a rallycross driver from Jēkabpils, Latvia. He is the winner of the Super1600 division in the European Rallycross Championship in 2013 and is the youngest event winner in FIA World Rallycross Championship history.

Biography

Early career
Nitišs started racing go-karts at the age of seven and was quickly successful having won multiple Latvian national titles and the Baltic series by 13. He moved into rallycross and dominated the Baltic and NEZ championships before moving into the European Super1600 category in 2012. The 2013 season brought about a very successful period in which he won 6 out of 9 events on his way to the title.

World Rallycross
Olsbergs MSE (2014–15)
In 2014 he debuted in the FIA World Rallycross Championship Supercar category, driving a Ford Fiesta for Olsbergs MSE (OMSE) alongside Andreas Bakkerud. His career started promisingly, with a semi-final win and ultimately a podium finish in his first race, followed by qualification for the final in his second - which he later failed to take part in due to engine failure. His third event in Norway brought his first and so far only win in World Rallycross. A further three podiums and points finishes in every round cemented third place in the standings at seasons' end behind Petter Solberg and Toomas Heikkinen.

Despite staying with OMSE, 2015 was a much tougher year for Nitišs - the highlights being second in Hockenheim and third in Belgium. He failed to qualify for the semi-finals twice and despite once again finishing every round in the points he finished seventh in the standings compared to Bakkerud in fourth with over two events worth of points in hand.

Münnich Motorsport (2016)
For 2016, Nitišs switched to German outfit Münnich Motorsport and their brand new SEAT Ibiza Supercar. The first half of the season was challenging for him, with the new car's unreliability restricting him to two semi-final appearances. Following the initial struggle, Nitišs ultimately quit the team effective after the French round, despite reaching the final there.

Return to Olsbergs MSE (2016)
He returned to OMSE for three of the final four rounds, skipping Germany to allow the team to give RX Lites title winner Cyril Raymond a run in a Supercar. He made the semi-finals twice, at his inaugural home round in Latvia as well as Argentina.

Audi Sport EKS RX (2017)
On 20 February 2017, it was announced that Nitišs would move to reigning champions Audi Sport EKS RX for the 2017 season. The move will see the Latvian driving a third car which, under the current rules, is ineligible to score teams' championship points.

Racing record

Complete FIA North European Zone (NEZ) Rallycross Championship results
(key)

NEZ-1600

Complete FIA European Rallycross Championship results
(key)

Super1600

Supercar

Complete FIA World Rallycross Championship results
(key)

Supercar

Complete Global RallyCross Championship results
(key)

GRC Lites

Records
 Youngest winner in World Rallycross Supercars, at 18 years and 6 months.
 First WRX event winner from outside Scandinavia.
 First WRX event winner from the Baltic states.

References

External links
 
 
 
 Official profile page at the World RX website 

1995 births
Living people
Latvian racing drivers
European Rallycross Championship drivers
World Rallycross Championship drivers
People from Jēkabpils
24H Series drivers